Charisina is a genus of flies in the family Stratiomyidae.

Species
Charisina angustifrons Lindner, 1951

References

Stratiomyidae
Brachycera genera
Taxa named by Erwin Lindner
Diptera of South America